The 2018–19 season will be Újpest FC's 138th competitive season, 127nd consecutive season in the OTP Bank Liga and 126th year in existence as a football club.

Squad

Out on loan

Transfers

In

Out

Loans in

Loans out

Competitions

Nemzeti Bajnokság I

League table

Results summary

Results

Magyar Kupa

UEFA Europa League

Qualifying rounds

Squad Statistics

Appearances and goals

|-
|colspan="12"|Players away on loan :

|-
|colspan="12"|Players who left Újpest during the season:

|}

Goal scorers

Disciplinary Record

References

External links
 Official Website
 UEFA
 fixtures and results

Újpest FC seasons
Hungarian football clubs 2018–19 season